The Most–Moldava railway  is a branch line in Czech Republic, which was originally built and operated by the Prague-Dux Railway. The line, formerly known as theTeplitz Semmering Railway (Teplitzer Semmeringbahn) runs from Most (Brüx) over the Ore Mountains to Moldava (Moldau) and used to have a junction with the Nossen-Moldau railway there in Saxony until 1945. In the Czech Republic the line is known today as the Moldavská horská dráha (Moldau Mountain Railway) or Krušnohorská železnice (Ore Mountain Railway).

Sources

External links 
 Most–Moldava at www.zelpage.cz
 Description 
 Beschreibung 
 Most–Moldava photo page at www.bahnmotive.de 
 Homepage of the Krušnohorske železnice Club  
 

Railway lines in the Czech Republic
Transport in the Ore Mountains